Jocelyn "Jocjoc" Isada Bolante (born August 27, 1951) is a Filipino politician who formerly served as an Undersecretary of the Department of Agriculture of the Philippines. He was implicated by the Philippine Senate to the ongoing investigation related to corruption concerning fertilizer funding while serving as a government official. Bolante left the Philippines on December 11, 2005. He returned to the Philippines on October 28, 2008, after being detained at an immigration office in the United States. The corruption related to fertilizer funds was exposed when news broke that a Filipino journalist, Marlene Garcia-Esperat (who was from Tacurong City, Sultan Kudarat, Philippines), was killed on March 24, 2005.

Personal profile
A native of Dao, Capiz, Bolante was born to parents Vicente Bolante, Sr. (deceased) and Salvacion Isada (deceased).  He has three siblings, namely Vicente Jr., Anabelle and Cecilia.

Political career
Bolante was appointed by President Gloria Macapagal Arroyo as Undersecretary of Agriculture for Finance and Administration in 2001.  He served in this capacity for almost three years. He resigned on September 6, 2004.

Bolante ran unsuccessfully for governor of his home province of Capiz in the 2010 general elections under the local party Ugyon Kita Capiz (Unite Capiz), where he was defeated by incumbent governor Victor A. Tanco. The said party endorsed the Nacionalista Party and supported presidential candidate Senator Manny Villar and his running mate Senator Loren Legarda on the same year.

Corruption case
Bolante was implicated by the Philippine Senate to a fertilizer fund scam which amounts to P728 million.  Based on his statements, the fund was "taken from" the Department of Agriculture's "2003 budget and distributed to local government officials (105 congressmen, 53 governors, 23 mayors) as project proponents two weeks before the 2004 elections, and was believed to have been diverted to the campaign pot of President Gloria Arroyo."

References

External links
Photograph of Jocelyn Bolante from Capiznon.wordpress.com

1951 births
Living people
People from Capiz
Nacionalista Party politicians
Arroyo administration personnel
Visayan people